Joseph M. Beck (April 21, 1823 – May 30, 1893) was a justice of the Iowa Supreme Court from January 1, 1868, to December 31, 1891, appointed from Lee County, Iowa.

References

Justices of the Iowa Supreme Court